Enayatiyeh (also Romanized as ‘Enāyatīyeh) is a village in Golshan Rural District, in the Central District of Tabas County, South Khorasan Province, Iran. At the 2006 census, its population was 24, in 8 families.

References 

Populated places in Tabas County